Peter Chou (Chinese: 周永明) or Win Than (born 24 November 1956) is the former HTC CEO chief executive officer and a co-founder of HTC.  Chou founded HTC with Cher Wang (王雪紅) and H.T.Cho (卓火土) before being named CEO of HTC in 2004, succeeding H.T.Cho. In order to spearhead innovation initiatives for HTC, Chou would later serve as head of HTC Future Development Lab starting early 2015, with Cher Wang succeeding as CEO.

Early life and education
Chou, a member of the Burmese Chinese community, was born in Mandalay, Burma (now Myanmar) in 1956. Chou's father worked in Burma's jade industry. He attended Mandalay Regional College.

After school, Chou went to Taiwan and continued to study part-time in the car audio company assembling electronic parts. Chou graduated from National Taiwan Ocean University in 1985 with a degree in Electrical Engineering. 
In 1987, Chou became a senior engineer at Digital Equipment Corporation; in 1997, HP merged with DEC.

In 1997, he founded HTC with Cher Wang (王雪紅) and H.T.Cho (卓火土). Chou had received an Executive MBA from National Chengchi University in 2003 after co-founding HTC. He attended Harvard Business School's six-week Advanced Management Program.

In 2013, HTC launched one of the first smartphones to offer commercial off-the-shelf compatibility with Burmese language text.

Career 
Before HTC

Prior to joining HTC, Chou spent 10
years with Digital Equipment Corporation (DEC), eventually serving as director
before DEC's later merger with HP Corporation.

HTC Corporation

Chou was asked
to join the founding of HTC Corporation by former superior H.T. Cho in 1997, and
was named CEO in 2004. Under his leadership, Chou has led the charge not only
to establish HTC as a global smartphone brand, but also the shaping of the
global smartphone industry landscape in its early years. Chou's term as CEO was
credited with many industry innovations, from the first 4G-capable smartphone
to one of the first smartphones to offer commercial off-the-shelf compatibility with Burmese
language text.

With his
strong belief and industry experience in the values of entrepreneurship and
innovation, Chou saw to adjusting his CEO leadership roles to directing product
initiatives at the forefront as head of HTC Future Development Lab, with Cher
Wang succeeding the mantle as CEO of HTC Corporation in early 2015.

Chou has
received numerous awards including Laptop Magazine's #5 most influential mobile
executive, the prestigious Wireless Week Leadership Award for extraordinary
achievements in mobile communications and T3 Magazine's #13 most influential
technology executive.

Personal life 
In his spare
time, Chou enjoys reading, appreciating all forms of art and listening to
classical music.

References

External links
 Interview with The Verge
 Biography

1954 births
Living people
Taiwanese billionaires
Businesspeople from Taipei
People from Mandalay
Burmese people of Chinese descent
Taiwanese chief executives
National Chengchi University alumni